Fauna of Latvia may refer to:
 List of birds of Latvia
 List of mammals of Latvia

See also
 Outline of Latvia